The state anthem of the Republic of Kazakhstan is the former national anthem of Kazakhstan from 1992 to early 2006. Upon independence in December 1991, the melody of the Kazakh SSR anthem, composed by musicians Mūqan Tölebaev, Yevgeny Brusilovsky and Latif Hamidi, was retained; and new lyrics written by authors Mūzafar Älımbaev, Qadyr Myrza Älı, Tūmanbai Moldağaliev and Jadyra Därıbaeva were adopted in 1992. The lyrics were written by four people including poet Jadyra Därıbaeva, one of only a handful of women to have ever been involved in writing a national anthem. On 7 January 2006, it was replaced by "Menıñ Qazaqstanym".

Lyrics

See also

List of historical national anthems

Notes

References

External links

Lyrics score - Kazakhstan 1992–2006
Kazakhstan National Anthems

Historical national anthems
Kazakhstani music
National symbols of Kazakhstan
Kazakhstan
Kazakh anthems